Deportivo La Coruña's 1994–95 season included its 30th appearance in La Liga, where it finished as runner-up. The club also competed in the Copa del Rey and the UEFA Cup.

Summary

Arsenio Iglesias guided Deportivo to the most successful season in their history, up to that point, in 1994–95. They matched their performance from the previous season in both La Liga, where they finished as runners-up four points behind champions Real Madrid, and the UEFA Cup, where they were eliminated after extra time in the third round by German side Borussia Dortmund. However, their greatest success came in the Copa del Rey. The first cup final in their history saw them face Valencia at Santiago Bernabéu Stadium in Madrid on 24 June, and the first half went well as Javier Manjarín gave Depor the lead after 35 minutes. Valencia equalised through Predrag Mijatović with twenty minutes to play, but nine minutes later the match was suspended due to heavy rain and hail.

The remaining eleven minutes were played three days later, and Deportivo retook the lead just two minutes after the restart through Alfredo Santaelena. They held on to win 2–1 and claim their first major trophy in the most unusual of circumstances. Iglesias retired from coaching at the end of the season, and was replaced by Welshman John Toshack, who had previously been manager of Real Sociedad.

Players

Squad
Source:

Left club during season
Source:

Transfers

In

Out

Statistics
Last updated on 27 April 2021.

|-
|colspan="14"|Players who have left the club after the start of the season:

|}

Competitions

La Liga

League table

Positions by round

Matches

UEFA Cup

First round

Deportivo La Coruña won 4–2 on aggregate

Second round

Deportivo La Coruña won 4–2 on aggregate

Third round

Borussia Dortmund won 3–2 on aggregate

References

Deportivo de La Coruna
Deportivo de La Coruña seasons